"That Night, A Forest Grew" is the seventh episode of the second season and nineteenth overall episode of the American television drama series Dexter, which first aired on 11 November 2007 on Showtime in the United States. The episode was written by Daniel Cerone and was directed by Jeremy Podeswa.

Title
The episode's title is a quote from the children's book, Where the Wild Things Are.

Plot

A written manifesto sent by the Bay Harbor Butcher to a local newspaper sends Lundy's special task force scrambling to find clues in it. Eventually Lundy discovers that the manifesto was only written to confuse the police. This leads the task force to conclude that the Bay Harbor Butcher is a member of the police. Doakes almost discovers the truth about Dexter's past, which forces Dexter to devise a plan to get him suspended from the police force. Doakes attacks Dexter in front of the entire department and is suspended. During a romantic dinner with Dexter, Lila learns that Dexter plans to attend one of Cody's school events where he will see Rita, and becomes jealous. In retaliation, Lila sets her apartment on fire using a blowtorch. Lila calls Dexter, pretending it was a horrible accident, in order to get Dexter's attention. Rita is wary of Dexter spending time with her kids. She finds out her mother was fired from her old school district over a year ago. Her mother and her argue back and forth until Rita stands up to her mother and compels her to move out of the house. Debra breaks up with Gabriel and tells him that he isn't the one for her. Lundy and Debra kiss on the docks while eating lunch.

Production

Filming locations for the episode included Miami, Florida, as well as Long Beach, Los Angeles, and Pasadena, California.

Reception

The episode was positively received. IGN's Eric Goldman gave the episode a rating of 9.3 out of 10, and commented that "[a]ll these elements are combining to make Dexter a sort of intensely horrific version of a soap opera. And with a show about a serial killer, that's not a bad thing at all. This was a very strong episode, deftly weaving together several plotlines and upping the tension in several ways." The A.V. Club critic Scott Tobias gave the episode a B+ grade and stated that "[a]las, 'That Night A Forest Grew' was not a perfect episode, which shouldn't surprise me too much, given that the show has yet to put an 'A'-worthy hour for me in the whole of its run. Tonight, I was a little worried over a concern that Alan Sepinwall has voiced in his weekly write-ups this season: Basically, the possibility of Dexter turning into Vic Mackey on The Shield, stretching credibility as he miraculously slips the knot, season after season. Ironically, I'm rarely bothered by that element of The Shield, but it can be a bit of a distraction on Dexter, because Dex's ability to elude justice isn't as interesting as his compulsion to break the law. It's not that his attempts to sabotage the investigation aren't entertaining; they just don't fit with the overall intent of the show. [...] This was mostly a very strong hour."

References

External links

 
 "That Night, A Forest Grew" at Showtime's website

2007 American television episodes
Dexter (TV series) episodes
Television episodes directed by Jeremy Podeswa